Bernews is a Bermudian English-language online multimedia news website, founded by Patricia Burchall on 1 March 2010.

Bernews is Bermuda's first web-based news platform providing coverage 24 hours a day, 7 days a week.

Sections
 Business
 Crime
 COVID
 Entertainment
 Environment
 Faith
 News
 Obituaries
 Sports
 Style
 Tech
 Photos
 Videos
 TV

Bernews also hosts several sub-sites, including:
 BermudaElection.com
 ForeverBermuda.com
 BermudaCovid.com
 Bernews.TV

Awards
 The Bermudian Magazine's Best of Bermuda Awards - Best Source of Local News and Information, 2013
Bermuda Yellow Pages People's Choice Award - Best News Provider, November 2012
 The Bermudian Magazine's Best of Bermuda Awards - Award of Excellence, 2011
 The Bermudian Magazine's Best of Bermuda Awards - Best Source of Local News and Information, 2011
 TechWeek Awards - Best Local Website, 2010

References

External links
 

Bermudian news websites